Noriko Koiso (née Hamaguchi, 小磯典子、旧姓濱口、born 15 January 1974) is a Japanese former basketball player who competed in the 1996 Summer Olympics and in the 2004 Summer Olympics.

References

1974 births
Living people
Japanese women's basketball players
Olympic basketball players of Japan
Basketball players at the 1996 Summer Olympics
Basketball players at the 2004 Summer Olympics
Asian Games medalists in basketball
Basketball players at the 1994 Asian Games
Basketball players at the 1998 Asian Games
Basketball players at the 2002 Asian Games
Asian Games gold medalists for Japan
Asian Games silver medalists for Japan
Medalists at the 1994 Asian Games
Medalists at the 1998 Asian Games
21st-century Japanese women
20th-century Japanese women